The first USS Dauntless (SP-1002) was a United States Navy patrol vessel in commission from 1917 to 1919.

Dauntless was built as a private motorboat of the same name around 1917 by W. Frank Harrison at Essex, Connecticut. On 11 September 1917, the U.S. Navy – whose inspectors had described Dauntless as a "new well built vessel ... suitable for gov't use as scout patrol in conn. with aeroplane work" – leased her from her owner, R. T. H. Barnes of Roxidge Avon, Connecticut, for use as a section patrol boat during World War I. She was commissioned as USS Dauntless (SP-1002) on 1 October 1917.

Assigned to the 2nd Naval District in southern New England, Dauntless served on patrol duties for the rest of World War I and into the early months of 1919.

The Navy returned Dauntless to Barnes on 17 May 1919.

Notes

References
 
 Department of the Navy Naval History and Heritage Command Online Library of Selected Images: Civilian Ships: Dauntless (American Motor Boat, circa 1917). Served as Dauntless (SP-1002) in 1917–1919.
 NavSource Online: Section Patrol Craft Photo Archive Dauntless(SP 1002)

Patrol vessels of the United States Navy
World War I patrol vessels of the United States
Ships built in Connecticut
1917 ships